Walk With Me is the debut EP by Bugzy Malone. The EP entered the UK Albums Chart at number eight. The EP was released on July 24, 2015. The EP was released on independent record label Grimey Limey.

Track listing

References 

Bugzy Malone albums
2015 debut EPs
Grime music EPs